The Australian Production Design Guild was established in 2009 as a non-profit organisation that aims to:

• Represent designers and their associates in screen, live performance, events and digital production across Australia.
• Recognise and nurture excellence in design through awards, mentoring and accreditation.
• Raise the profile of stage and screen design and facilitate a vibrant design community.

The guild is headquartered in Sydney.

Awards
The guild recognises people working in the Australian production design industry. Members of the guild nominate work they completed in the previous year. The nominations are judged by a judging panel.

The guild offers awards for best production design, best visual effect and a members' choice award.

The 2018 awards included over 20 categories and winners.

References

1988 establishments in Australia
Australian film awards
Awards established in 1988
Film organisations in Australia
Organisations based in Sydney
Guilds in Australia